Ban Phaeo is a district (amphoe) in the northern part of Samut Sakhon province, central Thailand.

History
In the past the district was covered with deep forest. Hunters who traveled to hunt wild animals there always lost their way, so they agreed to make meeting points by using phaeo flags. When people established a new village, they named their village Ban Phaeo. It was controlled by Sam Phran district. Later when the village grew bigger it became a tambon. In 1925 the government split Tambon Rong Khe, Lak Sam from Ban Bo District and merged it with Tambon Ban Phaeo to form the Ban Phaeo District. The new district was assigned to Samut Sakhon Province.

Geography
Neighboring districts are (from the north clockwise): Sam Phran of Nakhon Pathom province; Krathum Baen and Mueang Samut Sakhon of Samut Sakhon Province; Mueang Samut Songkhram of Samut Songkhram province; Damnoen Saduak and Bang Phae of Ratchaburi province.

Ban Phaeo can be considered as "green zone of Samut Sakhon", because there are no factories in the area.

Administration
The district is divided into 12 subdistricts (tambons), which are further subdivided into 97 villages (mubans). There are three townships (thesaban tambons): Ban Phaeo, Kaset Phatthana, and Lak Ha. The non-municipal area is administered by seven tambon administrative organizations (TAO).

Economy
Ban Phaeo is a district that is well known as the area where young aromatic coconut trees are grown widely. In addition, Ban Phaeo is also the largest breeding place for snakeskin gourami fish in the country.

References

Ban Phaeo